See National Front for details of the far-right party.
The National Front's election results in parliamentary elections are shown below.

United Kingdom elections

Summary of general election performance

By-elections, 1967–70

General election, 18 June 1970

By-elections, 1970–74

General elections, 28 February and 10 October 1974

 Newham S 1974 by election, see below

By-elections, 1974–79

General election, 3 May 1979

By-elections, 1980–83

General election, 9 June 1983

By-elections, 1984–87

General election, 11 June 1987
In the late 1980s, the NF split into the Flag Group and the Official National Front. The latter stood no candidates whereas the former only stood one in Bristol East as an 'Independent NF'.

By-elections, 1987–92
{| class="wikitable sortable"
|-
! Date of election !! Constituency !! Candidate !! Votes !! %
|-
| 18 December 1988 || Epping Forest || Tina Wingfield || 286 || 0.6
|-
| rowspan="2"|15 June 1989 || rowspan="2"|Vauxhall || Ted Budden || 83 || 0.3
|-
| Patrick Harrington (as "Independent National Front") || 127 || 0.4% 
|-
| 22 March 1990 || Mid Staffordshire || C J G Hill || 311 || 0.5
|-
| 18 October 1990 || Eastbourne || J McAuley || 154 || 0.3
|-
| 9 November 1990 || Bradford North || R I Tenney || 305 || 0.8
|}

General election, 9 April 1992

By-elections, 1992–97

General election, 1 May 1997

By-elections, 1997–2001

General election, 7 June 2001

By-elections, 2001–2005

General election, 5 May 2005

By-elections, 2005–2010

General election, 6 May 2010
Although the NF had planned to stand 25 candidates, in the event it fielded only 17. The NF did not compete in Northern Ireland and instead encouraged supporters there to support the Traditional Unionist Voice.

By-elections, 2010–2015

General election, 7 May 2015

By-elections, 2015–2017

Scottish Parliament
In UK parliamentary elections, the NF has only ever contested 3 Scottish constituencies: Glasgow Govan (October 1974), Glasgow Pollok (1979) and the 1980 Glasgow Central by-election.

The NF stood for the first time ever in the 2011 Scottish Parliamentary elections by fielding 6 candidates - 1 for the North East region and 5 (3 of whom stood for the North East region too) for the constituencies. It failed to save any deposits or win any seats and achieved between 0.8% and 1.6% of the vote in the constituencies it contested (0.08% of the nationwide vote).

Scottish Parliament election, 5 May 2011Source: BBC News

By-election

Scottish Parliament election, 5 May 2016Source:'' BBC News

European Parliament elections 
The National Front stood in the 1989 and 1994 European elections but has not stood in European elections since as it feels that standing in them is endorsing them.

1989 European Parliament election

1994 European Parliament election

References

External links
 By elections site
 Elections site
 Greater London Council Election Results

National Front (UK)
Election results by party in the United Kingdom